Christian Hommel (born January 23, 1981) is a German former professional ice hockey defenseman. He most notably played for Iserlohn Roosters in the Deutsche Eishockey Liga (DEL). Upon the completion of his 16-year career, Hommel finished third in All-time games played with Iserlohn appearing in 457 regular season contests.

References

External links

1981 births
Living people
Arizona Sundogs players
German ice hockey left wingers
Hamburg Freezers players
Iserlohn Roosters players
Kassel Huskies players
People from Hemer
Sportspeople from Arnsberg (region)